"Say It's Gonna Rain" is a song by American dance-pop group Will to Power. The original version of the song appeared on their 1988 self-titled debut album. The lead vocals on the track were sung by singer-songwriter Suzi Carr. A 12" single was released to clubs in 1988, and this remix became the first of two number-one songs for the band on the American dance chart. The song spent two weeks at number-one on this chart in August and September 1988. The song also peaked at number 49 on the Billboard Hot 100 chart in July 1988.

Track listing
US 12" single #1

 US 12" Single #2

Charts

See also
List of number-one dance singles of 1988 (U.S.)

References

1988 singles
Will to Power (band) songs
1988 songs
Epic Records singles